The Arizona Complex League Guardians are a Rookie-level affiliate of the Cleveland Guardians, competing in the Arizona Complex League of Minor League Baseball. The team plays its home games at Goodyear Ballpark in Goodyear, Arizona. The team is composed mainly of players who are in their first year of professional baseball either as draftees or non-drafted free agents from the United States, Canada, Dominican Republic, Venezuela, and other countries.

History
The Cleveland Indians previously fielded a Rookie-level team in the Gulf Coast League (GCL) during three tenures (1967–1975, 1988–1990, and 2006–2008) known as the Gulf Coast League Indians. The team played at Chain of Lakes Park in Winter Haven, Florida, during 2006–2008. Notable players for the GCL Indians include Jeff Newman in 1970; Newman went on to play in Major League Baseball from 1976 to 1984, and was one of three managers for the 1986 Oakland Athletics.

In 2009, when the major-league Indians moved their spring training from Florida to Arizona, the Rookie-level team moved to the Arizona League (AZL), becoming the Arizona League Indians. The team has competed in Arizona since then. In 2018 and 2019, the team fielded two squads in the league, differentiated by suffixes (1 and 2, or Blue and Red). Prior to the 2021 season, the Arizona League was renamed as the Arizona Complex League (ACL). Following the rebranding of the Cleveland Indians to the "Cleveland Guardians" prior to the 2022 season, the organization's domestic complex team was renamed the "ACL Guardians."

Rosters

Season-by-season

References

External links
 Official website (Blue)
 Official website (Red)

Professional baseball teams in Arizona
Cleveland Guardians minor league affiliates
Defunct Florida Complex League teams
Arizona Complex League teams
Baseball teams established in 1967
1967 establishments in Florida
Sports in Polk County, Florida
Winter Haven, Florida
Goodyear, Arizona
Sports in Maricopa County, Arizona